Matthias Pintscher (born 29 January 1971) is a German composer and conductor. As a youth, he studied the violin and conducting.

Life and career
Pintscher was born in Marl, North Rhine-Westphalia. He began his music studies with Giselher Klebe in 1988 at the Hochschule für Musik Detmold, in Detmold. In 1990, he met Hans Werner Henze, and in 1991 and 1992, he was invited to Henze's summer school in Montepulciano, Italy. He later studied with German composer and flutist Manfred Trojahn. He held a Daniel R Lewis Young Composer Fellowship with the Cleveland Orchestra from 2000 to 2002.

In October 2010, Pintscher became the first Artist-in-Association with the BBC Scottish Symphony Orchestra. In June 2012, the Ensemble intercontemporain announced the appointment of Pintscher as its next music director, beginning in the September 2013–14 season, with an initial contract of three years. Since the 2014/15 season, Pintscher was appointed artist in residence with the Danish Radio for a period of three years. He serves as a professor of composition at the Juilliard School. For the 2014/15 season, he is the artist in residence at the Cologne Philharmonie.

Several of his orchestral and vocal works have been performed at such venues as Carnegie Hall and the Royal Albert Hall. His 2012 double trumpet concerto "Chute d'Étoiles – Hommage à Anselm Kiefer" was inspired by the work of Igor Stravinsky. It was first performed by the Cleveland Orchestra at Lucerne Festival in 2012. The US premiere was at Carnegie Hall, also with the Cleveland Orchestra. The UK premier was performed at Glasgow City Halls by the BBC Scottish Symphony Orchestra on 16 May 2013.

Pintscher has lived in New York City since 2008.

On 21 August 2016, Pintscher conducted his own piece Reflections on Narcissus and Mendelssohn's A Midsummer Night's Dream in the BBC Proms 48.

Published works

Piano
Monumento I (1991)
Tableau / Miroir (1992)
Nacht. Mondschein (1994)
on a clear day (2004)
whirling tissue of light (2013)

Chamber music
2° quartetto d’archi (1990)
Partita for solo cello (1991)
Omaggio a Giovanni Paisiello for violin (1991, revised 1995)
4° quartetto d’archi "Ritratto di Gesualdo" (1992)
Sieben Bagatellen mit Apotheose der Glasharmonika for bass clarinet (1993, revised 2001) or for clarinet (1994, revised 2001)
Départ (Monumento III) for ensemble (1993, revised 1995)
dernier espace avec introspecteur for accordion and cello (1994)
Figura II / Frammento for string quartet (1997)
Figura I for accordion and string quartet (1998)
in nomine for solo viola (1999)
Figura IV / Passaggio for string quartet (1999)
Figura III for accordion (2000)
Figura V / Assonanza for cello (2000)
Janusgesicht for viola and cello (2001)
Study I for Treatise on the Veil for violin and cello (2004)
Study II for Treatise on the Veil for violin, viola and cello (2006)

Orchestral music
Invocazioni (1991)
Devant une neige (Monumento II) (1993)
Dunkles Feld – Berückung (1993, revised 1998)
Choc (Monumento IV) (1996)
Five Orchestral Pieces (1997)
sur "Départ" (2000)
with lilies white (2001–02)
Towards Osiris (2005)
Verzeichnete Spur (2006)
Osiris (2008)
Mar'eh (2011)
Ex Nihilo (2011)
idyll (2014)

Concertos
La Metamorfosi di Narciso for cello and ensemble (1992)
tenebrae for viola and small ensemble with live electronics (2000–2001)
en sourdine for violin and orchestra (2003)
Reflections on Narcissus for cello and orchestra (2005)
Transir for flute and chamber orchestra (2006)
Sonic Eclipse for solo trumpet, solo horn and ensemble (2009–2010)
Chute d'Etoiles for 2 trumpets and orchestra (2012)
Un despertar for cello and orchestra (2017)

Theatrical music
Gesprungene Glocken (1993-1994, revised 2000)
Thomas Chatterton, opera (1994–1998)
L’espace dernier (2002–2003)

Voice
Gesprungene Glocken for soprano and orchestra (1996)
a twilight's song for soprano and seven instruments (1997)
Music from "Thomas Chatterton" for baritone an orchestra (1998)
Monumento V for eight voices, 3 cellos and ensemble (1998)
Hérodiade Fragmente for soprano and orchestra (1999)
Lieder und Schneebilder for soprano and piano (2000)
Vers quelque part ... – façons de partir for women's voices and percussion (2000) or for women's voices, percussion, three cellos and live electronics (2001)
She-Cholat Ahavah Ani (Shir ha-Shirim V) for mixed chorus a cappella (2008)
songs from Solomon's Garden for baritone and chamber orchestra (2009)

References

External links 
Publisher's biography, discography and bibliography, (German, English
website of the composer
 

1971 births
Living people
People from Marl, North Rhine-Westphalia
German classical composers
Studienstiftung alumni
20th-century classical composers
21st-century classical composers
German expatriates in the United States
Musicians from New York City
Hochschule für Musik Detmold alumni
20th-century conductors (music)
21st-century American composers
German male classical composers
20th-century German composers
20th-century American composers
21st-century German composers
21st-century conductors (music)
20th-century American male musicians
21st-century American male musicians